Bunch Reservoir is one of a trio of lakes on the Little Colorado River that provides trout fishing opportunities in and around the town of Greer.

Location

The Greer Lakes, as they are collectively known, include Bunch, Tunnel and River Reservoirs, and are a short distance apart from each other.

Description

The Department stocks the lake with catchable-sized rainbow trout in the spring and summer. Like its two neighboring reservoirs, Bunch gets a few brown trout from the Little Colorado River diversion that refills it in the winter, but browns are not stocked here.

Fish species

 Rainbow trout
 Brown trout

References

Sources

External links
Arizona Boating Locations Facilities Map
Arizona Fishing Locations Map

White Mountains (Arizona)
Reservoirs in Apache County, Arizona
Apache-Sitgreaves National Forests
Reservoirs in Arizona